Revolt of Iberian nobles was the revolt of the Iberian nobles against Saurmag I that took place in Iberia during 3rd century BCE.

Revolt 
According to "Life of Kartvelian kings", the nobles of Iberia united to kill Saurmag. Learning of the plot, Saurmag took refuge in the land of Durdzuks (ancestors of modern-day Vainakhs), a country of his mother’s origin. With the Durdzuk help, Saurmag suppressed the revolt, and went on to create a new class of nobles directly dependent on the crown.

References

Bibliography 
 

History of the Caucasus
History of Georgia (country)
History of Ingushetia
Wars involving Ingushetia
History of Chechnya
Wars involving Chechnya